Rainier National Forest was established in Washington on March 2, 1907, when its name was changed from Mount Rainier Forest Reserve. In 1905 federal forests were transferred to the U.S. Forest Service. On October 13, 1933, Rainier was divided between Columbia, Snoqualmie and Wenatchee National Forests. Its lands exists presently as portions of Mount Baker-Snoqualmie, Wenatchee and Gifford Pinchot National Forests.

References

External links
Forest History Society
Forest History Society:Listing of the National Forests of the United States Text from Davis, Richard C., ed. Encyclopedia of American Forest and Conservation History. New York: Macmillan Publishing Company for the Forest History Society, 1983. Vol. II, pp. 743-788.

Former National Forests of Washington (state)